Soundrya Production is Production Company in India which is founded by Vinod Bachchan and the company has debut in 2011, movie Tanu Weds Manu.

Film production

References 

Film production companies of Delhi
Film distributors of India
Indian companies established in 2011